Sharafuddin Ashraf (born 10 January 1995) is an Afghan cricketer. He made his international debut for the Afghanistan cricket team in July 2014.

Domestic career
In July 2018, he was the leading wicket-taker for Amo Sharks in the 2018 Ghazi Amanullah Khan Regional One Day Tournament, with twelve dismissals in five matches. He was named as the player of the tournament for his all-round performance.

In September 2018, he was named in Paktia's squad in the first edition of the Afghanistan Premier League tournament.

International career
He made his One Day International debut for Afghanistan against Zimbabwe in July 2014. He made his Twenty20 International debut against the Netherlands in the 2015 ICC World Twenty20 Qualifier tournament on 9 July 2015.

In February 2019, he was named in Afghanistan's Test squad for their one-off match against Ireland in India, but he did not play. In July 2021, he was named as one of four reserve players in Afghanistan's One Day International (ODI) squad for their series against Pakistan. In September 2021, he was named in Afghanistan's squad for the 2021 ICC Men's T20 World Cup.

References

External links
 

1995 births
Living people
Afghan cricketers
Afghanistan One Day International cricketers
Afghanistan Twenty20 International cricketers
Amo Sharks cricketers
Paktia Panthers cricketers
Place of birth missing (living people)